This is a list of A-grade roads in Sri Lanka sorted by route number. A class roads are further classified in to sub classes AA, AB and AC.

Roads

Class AA Roads

Class AB Roads

Class AC Roads

See also
 List of B-Grade highways in Sri Lanka
 List of E-Grade expressways in Sri Lanka
 List of roads and highways
 Highway museum complex, Kiribathkumbura

References

 A
Sri Lanka
Highways